Sergey Anatolyevich Borisov (born 10 October 1972) is a former Russian professional footballer.

Club career
He made his professional debut in the Soviet Top League in 1991 for FC Torpedo Moscow.

Honours
 Soviet Top League bronze: 1991.
 Russian Cup winner: 1993.

European club competitions
With FC Torpedo Moscow.

 UEFA Cup 1991–92: 2 games.
 UEFA Cup 1992–93: 1 game.
 UEFA Cup Winners' Cup 1993–94: 2 games, 1 goal.

References

1972 births
Footballers from Moscow
Living people
Soviet footballers
Russian footballers
Association football midfielders
FC Torpedo Moscow players
FC Torpedo-2 players
FC Ural Yekaterinburg players
Soviet Top League players
Russian Premier League players
FC Torpedo Vladimir players